Hola is the Spanish word for "Hello" or "Hi".

Hola or HOLA may also refer to:

Places
 Hola, Kenya, a capital of the Tana River county.

Art and entertainment
 Hola/Chau, a double-live album by Los Fabulosos Cadillacs
 ¡Hola!, a weekly Spanish-language magazine
 Hola (card game), a Polish and Ukrainian trick-taking game related to Sedma 
 "Hola", a song by Miranda! from El Disco de Tu Corazón
 "Hola!", a song by Panda from La Revancha Del Príncipe Charro

Other uses
 Hola (VPN), a web and mobile application
 holA, a bacterial gene
 Hola Airlines, a Spanish airline based in Palma de Mallorca, Majorca
 Cyclone Hola, a strong tropical cyclone of the Pacific
 Hola Mohalla, a Sikh festival 
 Hispanic Organization of Latin Actors, a not-for-profit, arts service and advocacy organization

Surname
 Holá, feminine form of the Czech surname Holý
 Jindra Holá (born 1960), Czech ice dancer
 Peter Hola (born 1999), Australian-New Zealand rugby league footballer
 Pierre Hola (born 1978), Tongan rugby union footballer

See also
 
 Holla (disambiguation)
 Hola Hola (disambiguation)